The Baldwin DS-4-4-660 was a four-axle  diesel-electric switcher built by the Baldwin Locomotive Works at it Eddystone, Pennsylvania factory between 1946 and 1949. It replaced the  VO-660 in their catalog, and was in turn replaced by the  DS-4-4-750. It was the low power companion to Baldwin's DS-4-4-1000 models.

Original owners

References
 
 
 

DS-4-4-0660
B-B locomotives
Railway locomotives introduced in 1946
Diesel-electric locomotives of the United States
Standard gauge locomotives of the United States
Shunting locomotives